Touchstone Pictures was an American film production label of Walt Disney Studios, founded and owned by The Walt Disney Company. Feature films released under the Touchstone label were produced and financed by Walt Disney Studios, and featured more mature themes targeted towards adult audiences than typical Walt Disney Pictures films. As such, Touchstone was merely a brand of the studio and did not exist as a distinct business operation.

Established on February 15, 1984, by then-Disney CEO Ron W. Miller as Touchstone Films, Touchstone operated as an active film production division of Disney during the 1980s through the early 2010s, releasing a majority of the studio's PG-13 and R-rated films. In 2009, Disney entered into a five-year, thirty picture distribution deal with DreamWorks Pictures by which DreamWorks' productions would be released through the Touchstone banner; the label then distributed DreamWorks' films from 2011 to 2016.

Following the release of The Light Between Oceans, Touchstone Pictures went defunct in 2017, after 33 years in operation.

History

Background and conception 
Due to increased public assumption that Disney films were aimed at children and families, films produced by the Walt Disney Productions began to falter at the box office as a result. This began in 1975 with the release of Escape to Witch Mountain and its 1978 sequel. In late 1979, Walt Disney Productions released The Black Hole, a science-fiction movie that was the studio's first production to receive a PG rating (the company, however, had already distributed via Buena Vista Distribution its first PG-rated film, Take Down almost a year before the release of The Black Hole).

Over the next few years, Disney experimented with more PG-rated fare, such as the horror-mystery The Watcher in the Woods, the spy-themed comedy Condorman and the Paramount Pictures co-produced fantasy epic Dragonslayer. With Disney's 1982 slate of PG-rated films, which included the thriller drama Night Crossing and the science-fiction film Tron, the company lost over $27 million. Tron was considered a potential Star Wars-level success film by the film division.

In late 1982, Disney vice president of production Tom Wilhite announced that they would produce and release more mature films under a new brand. Wilhite elaborated to The New York Times: "We won't get into horror or exploitive sex, but using a non-Disney name will allow us wider latitude in the maturity of the subject matter and the edge we can add to the humor." He stated that one of the first films that would be released under this new brand was Trenchcoat, a comedy caper starring Margot Kidder and Robert Hays; however, the new brand had not yet been created by the time of the film's release in March 1983, so it was instead released by Walt Disney Productions, but with no production company credited in the released prints.

A loss of $33 million was registered by the film division in 1983 with the majority resulting from such films as the horror-fantasy adaptation of Ray Bradbury's novel Something Wicked This Way Comes, the horror-comedy The Devil and Max Devlin starring Elliott Gould and Bill Cosby, and the dramas Tex and Never Cry Wolf, the latter being a PG release that featured male nudity, did well as the studio downplayed the film's association with the Disney brand.

Touchstone Films 
Touchstone Films was founded by then-Disney CEO Ron W. Miller on February 15, 1984, as a label for their PG films with an expected three to four movies released under the label. Touchstone's first film was Splash, a huge hit for grossing $68 million at the domestic box office was released that year. Incoming Disney CEO Michael Eisner and film chief Jeffrey Katzenberg considered renaming the label to "Hollywood Pictures", which went on to become a separate Disney film label on February 1, 1989.

In 1986, Down and Out in Beverly Hills was another early success for Touchstone and was Disney's first R-rated film, followed in 1987 by Disney's first PG-13 rated film, Adventures in Babysitting. Disney increased the momentum with additional PG-13 and R-rated films with Ruthless People (1986), Outrageous Fortune (1987), Tin Men (1987), and other top movies. In April 1986, movies by Touchstone Films were licensed to Showtime/The Movie Channel for five years starting in 1987.

Touchstone Pictures 
Touchstone Films was renamed Touchstone Pictures after the release of Ruthless People in 1986. With the Touchstone movies, Disney moved to the top of box office receipts beating out all the other major film studios by 1988. On April 13, 1988, Touchstone became a unit of Walt Disney Pictures with newly appointed president Ricardo Mestres.

On October 23, 1990, The Walt Disney Company formed Touchwood Pacific Partners I to supplant the Silver Screen Partners partnership series as their movie studios' primary funding source.

With several production companies getting out of film production or closing shop by December 2, 1988, the Walt Disney Studios announced the formation of the Hollywood Pictures division, which would only share marketing and distribution with Touchstone, to fill the void. Mestres was appointed president of Hollywood. On July 27, 1992, Touchstone agreed to an exclusive, first-look production and distribution agreement with Merchant Ivory Productions to last three years.

Following the success of the Disney-branded PG-13-rated Pirates of the Caribbean: The Curse of the Black Pearl in 2003, and other films that in the 1980s and 1990s would have been released as Touchstone or Hollywood Pictures films, Disney weighed distribution of films more toward Disney-branded films and away from Touchstone Pictures, though not entirely disbanding them as it continued to use the Touchstone label for R and most PG-13 rated fare. In 2006, Disney limited Touchstone's output to two or three films in favor of Walt Disney Pictures titles due to an increase in film industry costs. Disney indicated scaling back on using multiple brands in 2007 with the renaming of Touchstone Television to ABC Television Studio in February and the outright elimination of the Buena Vista brand in April. On January 14, 2010, Sean Bailey was appointed the president of live-action production at Walt Disney Studios, overseeing all films produced by Walt Disney Pictures and Touchstone.

Distribution label 
In 2009, Disney repurposed Touchstone as a distribution label for films produced by DreamWorks Studios. Disney financed DreamWorks productions with $90 million more available under its agreement if DreamWorks could not get additional equity funding. In 2012, Disney reportedly was in early stages in considering Touchstone's fate, including a possible sale.

Following Disney's decision not to renew their long-standing deal with Jerry Bruckheimer Films in 2013, producer Jerry Bruckheimer revealed that he insisted on revitalizing the Touchstone label for production. Disney was uninterested, with studio chairman Alan Horn admitting that Touchstone's output had been reduced to only distributing DreamWorks' films as those films were in the label's interest. In addition to DreamWorks' films, Touchstone also released non Disney-branded animated films such as Gnomeo & Juliet, The Wind Rises, and Strange Magic.

By the end of the DreamWorks deal in August 2016, Disney had distributed 14 of DreamWorks' original 30-picture agreement, with thirteen through Touchstone. The deal ended with The Light Between Oceans being the final theatrical film released by Disney under the Touchstone banner. Universal Pictures then replaced Disney as DreamWorks' distributor. Disney retained the film rights to these DreamWorks films in perpetuity as compensation for the studio's outstanding loan.

As of 2017, following the release of The Light Between Oceans, the label became defunct. Since then, several other Disney divisions have produced or are developing television series and films based on previous Touchstone properties—such as Turner & Hooch, High Fidelity, Three Men and a Baby, Sister Act, and Real Steel—for Disney+ and Hulu. Following the acquisition of the entertainment assets of 21st Century Fox in 2019, both 20th Century Studios (formerly 20th Century Fox) and Searchlight Pictures (formerly Fox Searchlight Pictures) labels currently release the majority of adult and mature content produced by Walt Disney Studios.

Film library 

Some well-known Touchstone Pictures releases include Beaches, Turner & Hooch, Splash, The Waterboy, The Color of Money, Good Morning, Vietnam, Who Framed Roger Rabbit, Dead Poets Society, Pretty Woman, Sister Act, Ed Wood, Dick Tracy, The Insider, The Royal Tenenbaums, Sweet Home Alabama, The Hitchhiker's Guide to the Galaxy, The Help, War Horse, Lincoln, and Bridge of Spies. Its highest-grossing film release is Armageddon. Although animated films produced by Walt Disney Studios are primarily released by Walt Disney Pictures, Touchstone's animated releases include the original theatrical release of The Nightmare Before Christmas, Gnomeo & Juliet, The Wind Rises, and Strange Magic. Six Touchstone films have received an Oscar nomination for Best Picture: Dead Poets Society, The Insider, The Help, War Horse, Lincoln, and Bridge of Spies.

Through Touchstone, Disney's first R-rated film, Down and Out in Beverly Hills, came on January 31, 1986, and was a large box-office success. Ruthless People followed on June 27, 1986, and was also very successful. Both of these pictures starred Bette Midler, who had signed a six-picture deal with Disney and became a major film star again with these hits as well as Beaches and Outrageous Fortune.

One of the most notable key producers behind Touchstone films was Jerry Bruckheimer, who had a production deal with Disney from 1993 to 2014. Touchstone films produced by Bruckheimer include The Ref, Con Air, Armageddon, Enemy of the State, Gone in 60 Seconds, Coyote Ugly, and Pearl Harbor. In addition, Bruckheimer has also produced several other films released under the Disney and Hollywood labels.

Releases from Touchstone Pictures were distributed theatrically by Walt Disney Studios Motion Pictures and through home media platforms by Buena Vista Home Entertainment (branded as "Touchstone Home Entertainment").

Highest-grossing films

Related units

Touchstone Television 

Touchstone Television served as Touchstone Pictures' counterpart label for television programming, producing television series including The Golden Girls, Blossom, Home Improvement, My Wife and Kids, Desperate Housewives, Lost, Grey's Anatomy, Scrubs, Criminal Minds, and Monk. In 2007, the company was renamed ABC Studios, as part of a move by Disney to re-align its studios around core brands such as ABC.

On August 10, 2020, Disney announced that it would revive the Touchstone Television brand as a renaming of Fox 21 Television Studios, as part of its phase-out of the "Fox" brand from the studios it acquired from 21st Century Fox. At the same time, the existing ABC Studios was renamed ABC Signature.

However, about four months later on December 1, 2020, Disney announced the revived Touchstone Television label would be folded into 20th Television.

Touchstone Interactive 

By the end of 2007, Disney's video game subsidiary Buena Vista Games began to produce material under its own short-lived Touchstone imprint. As is the case with its motion picture and television counterparts, Touchstone Interactive merely acted as a brand label of Disney Interactive and not its own entity. The only title it released was the Turok video game in 2008.

References

Further reading 
 
 

 
1984 establishments in California
2016 disestablishments in California
American companies established in 1984
American companies disestablished in 2017
Disney production studios
Film production companies of the United States
Entertainment companies based in California
Companies based in Burbank, California
Mass media companies established in 1984
Mass media companies disestablished in 2017
Defunct brands
Walt Disney Studios (division)
The Walt Disney Company subsidiaries
Defunct film and television production companies of the United States